JOP may refer to:
 Java Optimized Processor, an implementation of a Java Virtual Machine
 Jon Oliva's Pain, an American heavy metal band
 Jop van der Linden (born 1990), Dutch footballer
 Mariusz Jop (born 1978), Polish footballer
 JOP: Journal of the Pancreas, a journal published by the predatory OMICS Publishing Group
 JOP, a nickname of J. O. Prestwich, a British historian

See also
 Jopp, a surname